Mićović is a Montenegrin and Serbian surname, which may refer to:

Joanikije Mićović, metropolitan of Montenegro
Marija Mićović, basketball player
Milica Mićović, basketball player
Strahinja Mićović, basketball player
Vladimir Mićović, Serbian football goalkeeper
Zoran Mićović, Mayor of Arilje

Montenegrin surnames
Serbian surnames